The crested oarfish (Lophotus lacepede) is a species of crestfish in the family Lophotidae. It is an oceanodromous fish ranging from waters 0–92 meters deep, but may get stranded in shallow waters.

Distribution and habitat 
The crested oarfish lives in warm seas near areas such as the Western Atlantic, Western Indian Ocean, Eastern Atlantic, and the Eastern Pacific within the oceanic and mesopelagic zone.

Description and ecology 
The crested oarfish has maximum length of 200 centimeters, but are often are only found at 100 centimeters in length. It has an ink sack near the cloaca, and discharges ink out of it when it feels alarmed. Its prey consists of squids and fishes such as anchovies. It is oviparous, and lays planktonic eggs.

Conservation 
The crested oarfish are likely found in marine protected areas, and has no known major threats towards it. No specific conservation measures have been made, and IUCN Red List has classified the fish as a 'least concern' species.

Synonymised names 
Placed by the WoRMS.

 Leptopus peregrinus Rafinesque, 1814
 Lophotes cristatus Johnson, 1863 (misspelling)
 Lophotus cepedianus Cloquet, 1823
 Lophotus cristatus Johnson, 1863
 Lophotus lacepedei Giorna, 1809 (misspelling)

References

External links

Lophotidae
Fish of Australia
Fish described in 1809